Believe in Nothing is the eighth studio album by British metal band Paradise Lost, released on 26 February 2001.

Release

The release for the album was postponed with the first release date being 18 September 2000, before settling to its current date. The band released commented on the reason for the delay stating:

Style, artwork, and reception 

It is one of the last albums in the much lighter sound which characterised the band's sound since One Second and that may have been contributed when composer Gregor Mackintosh stated that "doesn't really exist for him", as it was an album in which the band was out of creative control; the album went under strict instructions from the label. Mackintosh has also said that he feels some songs, such as "World Pretending", deserved a better sound and production.

There was more negativity of the album when the band's vocalist Nick Holmes was asked by fans of a Q&A session about in general how does the band choose who does the album artwork, Holmes stated "Don't ask me about the BIN cover, I think we (the band) had our drinks spiked that day!"

In 2007, Holmes elaborated:

In 2018, Holmes stated, regarding the remixed version of the album:

Track listing

2002 reissue

Japanese edition

Koch Records reissue

2018 remaster

Singles
A song called "Leave This Alone", recorded during the album's studio sessions, did not end up being on the album or the reissues. Instead, it was released on the "Fader" single. The song "Mouth" was remixed and ended up on the "Mouth" single. Both singles have music videos.

Personnel

Paradise Lost
 Nick Holmes – vocals and lyrics
 Gregor Mackintosh – lead guitar, keyboards, programming, string arrangements, and all music
 Aaron Aedy – rhythm guitar
 Steve Edmondson – bass
 Lee Morris – drums and backing vocals

Additional musicians on tracks 3, 7, 9 and "Gone"
Sally Herbert – violin, strings
Jacqueline Norrie – violin
Claire Orsler – viola
Clare Finnimore – viola
Sophie Harris – cello
Dinah Beamish – cello

Production
John Fryer – engineering, programming
Gerhard "Anyway" Wölfle – mixing
Michael Schwabe – mastering

Charts

References

2001 albums
Albums produced by John Fryer (producer)
EMI Records albums